Pakistan receives foreign aid from several countries and international organizations. Since the start of the War in Afghanistan, the majority of the aid comes from the United States via the Coalition Support Fund which is reimbursement to Pakistan for counter-terrorism operations. Foreign aid from America has been stopped since 2018.

Education aid 
Pakistan received $649 million in aid for education in 2015, the highest it had received so far. the aid had increased from $586 million in 2014 to $649 million in 2015. The paper also reports that Pakistan received the most aid out of all the countries in Southern Asia, with India just behind receiving $589 million in 2015. The biggest part of the aid to Pakistan was given for basic education. Out of the total $649 million, $371 million or 57.16 per cent was given for basic education.

Election support

One of the biggest organizations supporting the electoral process in Pakistan is the Election Support Group (ESG). ESG is an internationally supported group of interested parties, made 32 specific recommendations to the Election Commission based on the recommendations of 16 international organizations. A meeting was held in October 2009 to present these ideas to the commission. The Commission commissioned ESG to provide them with a recommendations on how to best solve the addressed problems.

Saudi Arabia

In 2013, Saudi Arabian government donated  to Pakistan to increase its foreign reserves and meet its needs of balance of trade deficit.

United States

Former US Ambassador to Pakistan Anne W. Patterson addressed senior bureaucrats at the National Management College and emphasised that the United States will assist Pakistan's new democratic government in the areas of development, stability, and security. The United States Agency for International Development (USAID) in Pakistan, officially announced the signing of an agreement valued at $8.4 million to help ease Pakistan's food crisis. It is also hoped by the United States that Pakistan under the administration of Nawaz Sharif would only strengthen relations between Pakistan and the United States. Since the start of the War in Afghanistan, the majority of the Aid comes from the United States. The Majority of US assistance to Pakistan is from the Coalition Support Fund which is reimbursement "to Pakistan for expenses already incurred and compensation for facilities made available to the coalition forces such as the Shamsi Airfield and Dalbandin air bases by Pakistan as well as $4 billion has been billed to CSF for the training and services provided by American Military and contractors."

Election support
In 2006, the International Foundation for Electoral Systems (IFES) implemented a 9 million dollar contract through USAID to install a computerised electoral rolls system for the Pakistani government.

USAID, IFES, United Nations Development Programme (UNDP), and National Democratic Institute for International Affairs (NDI) have also coordinated a number of initiatives to help train election officials in Pakistan. Part of this activity was the establishment of a Federal Election Academy and a library to support the Election Commission of Pakistan.

Financial aid to Pakistan since the 11 September 2001 attacks
Between 2002 and 2011, US Congress approved $18 billion in military and economic aid from the United States. However the Pakistan Treasury only received $8.647 billion in direct financial payments.

Western officials have claimed nearly 70% (roughly $3.4 billion) of military aid has been misspent in 2002–2007 and used to cover civilian deficit. However, Pakistan argues the civilian deficit was caused by poor economy from the War on Terror. However U.S-Pakistani relationship has been a transactional based and U.S. military aid to Pakistan and aid conditions has been shrouded in secrecy for several years until recently. Furthermore, a significant proportion of US economic aid for Pakistan has ended up back in the US, as funds are channelled through large US contractors. Pakistan also states it has spent $80 billion on the War on Terror since 2001.

Cuts in aid

The Kerry-Lugar Bill passed in 2009 after democratic elections in Pakistan had proposed $1.5 billion in annual assistance to Pakistan. However, due to problems and differences in the bilateral relationship over issues such as drone strikes, India, and the Raymond Davis incident, the full amount was not transferred. Pakistan was promised $1.5 billion annually till 2014, but in the very first year the target was not met. Only $179.5 million out of $1.51 billion in US civilian aid to Pakistan was actually disbursed in fiscal year 2010.

Expenditures

Of the $179.5 million received by Pakistan in 2010, $75 million of the US aid funds were transferred to bolster the Benazir Income Support Program, a social development program run by the Pakistani government. Another $45 million was given to the Higher Education Commission to support "centers of excellence" at Pakistani universities; $19.5 million went to support Pakistan's Fulbright Scholarship program; $23.3 million went to flood relief.

Role of corruption in foreign aid implementation
Pakistan has faced a significant problem in corruption and it has been detrimental to the country's economic, political and foreign aid standing. This corruption and a lack of transparency has been viewed as a key obstacle to the effective implementation of U.S. foreign aid in Pakistan. U.S. officials are concerned that a large proportion of the financial aid to Pakistan is being used to pay consulting fees and administration overhead. This was added to by the harassment of workers in the region and a need to pay officials bribes as a means to progress on projects in the region.

The United States officials, as a result of corruption, believe that channeling the aid through Pakistani agencies may lead to a more effective implementation of the foreign aid. Officials further supported this idea as they believe that Pakistani civilian bureaucracies did not have the capacity to be effective aid implementing partners. In addition to internal corruption, reports from Pakistan also suggest that large amounts of foreign aid were being used to fund its war against India and maintain a position of power against their rivals India. As a result, reportedly nearly half of the aid given to Pakistan is being rendered unused due to corruption and the United States believes that altering its method of channeling the aid is the way to improve the implementation.

Security concerns: public perception of U.S. aid
As a result of security concerns and inability of American aid workers to deliver the aid to certain regions in Pakistan, Pakistani institutions are responsible for a majority of the aid delivery to regions including the Federally Administered Tribal Areas (FATA). The areas needing the aid have residents that have anti-American sentiment and hence the delivery of any aid containing the American flag or label has led to several extremist attacks and reactions. In 2012, aid organizations including the International Committee of the Red Cross were forced to shut down operations in FATA regions of Pakistan after finding a British national employee had been beheaded as a result of negative perception to aid. The idea that the residents in these areas "don't like America anymore" poses great security risks for aid delivery for the United States and form a roadblock to the effective implementation of the aid in Pakistan. The need to outsource delivery to Pakistan leads to a lack of control and difficulty in monitoring and evaluating the implementation of the aid and has been a leading cause of the ineffective implementation of U.S. aid.

Perception Of US aid in Pakistan

Most Pakistani people were not happy about the US aiding the Pakistani government, because view in the streets was that the aid never reached ordinary Pakistanis, who not only suffered the consequences of war on its borders but also never benefited from the aid the US gave due to vast corruption in the government.

Military and economic aid

Total aid since independence 

In total, the United States obligated nearly $78.3 billion to Pakistan between 1948 and 2016 (adjusted to 2016 value of dollar).

United Kingdom
United Kingdom pledged £665 million to Pakistan from 2009 to 2013. Between 2014 and 2019, Pakistan was the largest recipient of direct UK foreign development aid. It received approximately £320 million in aid in 2019/20 as part of Department for International Development's programme.

Pakistani proposals for foreign assistance

Free trade deals
Pakistan has been trying to negotiate free trade deals with the EU and America as part of Western assistance in war against terror instead of aid. This policy is supported by the Washington-based think tank Center for Global Development

Debt cancellation
Pakistan has been trying to negotiate debt cancellation. Currently Pakistan spends $6 billion on debt servicing annually.

See also
Foreign trade of Pakistan
Saudi foreign assistance
Economy of Pakistan
China–Pakistan Economic Corridor

References

External links
 Reassessing Foreign Assistance to Pakistan
 Pakistan: U.S. Foreign Assistance Congressional Research Service

 
Foreign relations of Pakistan
Economy of Pakistan
Government of Liaquat Ali Khan